Ognjen Petrović (born 18 October 1993) is a Bosnian-Herzegovinian footballer who plays for FK Jedinstvo Žeravica in the Second League of the Republika Srpska.

Club career
Born in Gradiška, Bosnia and Herzegovina, he played with local club FK Kozara Gradiška in the 2011–12 Premier League of Bosnia and Herzegovina. At the end of the season Kozara was relegated and Petrović played in the 2012–13 First League of the Republika Srpska. During the winter break, he moved to Serbia by signing with top league side FK Javor Ivanjica. He made his debut in the 2012–13 Serbian SuperLiga on March 2, 2013, in a victory of Javor over FK Smederevo by 4-0. In summer 2013 he agreed a loan deal with FK Borac Banja Luka this way returning to the Bosnian top league. He later had a spell with Rudar Prijedor.

International career
Ognjen Petrović was a member of the Bosnian U-19 team. Since 2012 he has been a member of the Bosnian U-21 team.

References

1993 births
Living people
People from Gradiška, Bosnia and Herzegovina
Association football defenders
Bosnia and Herzegovina footballers
Bosnia and Herzegovina youth international footballers
Bosnia and Herzegovina under-21 international footballers
FK Kozara Gradiška players
FK Javor Ivanjica players
FK Borac Banja Luka players
FK Rudar Prijedor players
Premier League of Bosnia and Herzegovina players
First League of the Republika Srpska players
Serbian SuperLiga players
Bosnia and Herzegovina expatriate footballers
Expatriate footballers in Serbia
Bosnia and Herzegovina expatriate sportspeople in Serbia